The British Columbia Rugby Football Union was a Canadian football league, founded on September, 1, 1926. It lasted for 15 seasons, disbanding in 1941 as the Second World War brought most league football to a close. It was a member of the Western Canada Rugby Football Union along with the Alberta Rugby Football Union, Saskatchewan Rugby Football Union and the Manitoba Rugby Football Union. 

In 1941, the Vancouver Grizzlies joined the WIFU and lasted only a season. Later, in 1954 Vancouver was awarded a Western Interprovincial Football Union franchise: the British Columbia Lions.

Teams
Victoria Travellers Football Club + Victoria Capitals
Vancouver Meralomas
University of British Columbia Varsity
New Westminster Wildcats
Vancouver Athletic Club Wolves
New Westminster Dodekas 
North Shore Lions
Knights of Columbus
Victoria Revellers
Vancouver Bulldogs

BCRFU Champions

 1926  Victoria Travellers Football Club
 1927  University of British Columbia Varsity
 1928  University of British Columbia Varsity
 1929  Vancouver Athletic Club Wolves
 1930  Vancouver Meralomas
 1931  Vancouver Athletic Club Wolves
 1932  Vancouver Meralomas
 1933  Vancouver Meralomas
 1934  Vancouver Meralomas
 1935  Vancouver Meralomas
 1936  Vancouver Athletic Club Wolves
 1937  North Shore Lions
 1938  North Shore Lions
 1939  University of British Columbia Varsity
 1940  Victoria Revellers

Totals
5 - Vancouver Meralomas
3 - University of British Columbia Varsity
3 - Vancouver Athletic Club Wolves
2 - North Shore Lions football team
1 - Victoria Travellers Football Club
1 - Victoria Revellers

References

http://cflapedia.com/
http://www.bclions.com/

Canadian football in British Columbia
Defunct Canadian football leagues
Defunct rugby union leagues in Canada